In Greek mythology, Astypalaea (Ancient Greek: Ἀστυπάλαια ) or Astypale was a Phoenician princess as the daughter of King Phoenix and Perimede, daughter of Oeneus; thus she was the sister of Europa. In some accounts, her mother was called Telephe and her siblings were Phoenice, Peirus and again Europe. Astypale was a lover of Poseidon who seduced her, and had two sons by him: Ancaeus, King of Samos, and Eurypylos, King of Kos.

The island of Astypalaia was believed to have been named after her.

Notes

References 

 Apollodorus, The Library with an English Translation by Sir James George Frazer, F.B.A., F.R.S. in 2 Volumes, Cambridge, MA, Harvard University Press; London, William Heinemann Ltd. 1921. ISBN 0-674-99135-4. Online version at the Perseus Digital Library. Greek text available from the same website.
 Gaius Julius Hyginus, Fabulae from The Myths of Hyginus translated and edited by Mary Grant. University of Kansas Publications in Humanistic Studies. Online version at the Topos Text Project.
 Pausanias, Description of Greece with an English Translation by W.H.S. Jones, Litt.D., and H.A. Ormerod, M.A., in 4 Volumes. Cambridge, MA, Harvard University Press; London, William Heinemann Ltd. 1918. . Online version at the Perseus Digital Library

 Pausanias, Graeciae Descriptio. 3 vols. Leipzig, Teubner. 1903.  Greek text available at the Perseus Digital Library.
 Stephanus of Byzantium, Stephani Byzantii Ethnicorum quae supersunt, edited by August Meineike (1790-1870), published 1849. A few entries from this important ancient handbook of place names have been translated by Brady Kiesling. Online version at the Topos Text Project.

Princesses in Greek mythology
Mortal parents of demigods in classical mythology
Women of Poseidon
Agenorides
Phoenician characters in Greek mythology